Joël Henry (born 19 April 1962 in Armentières, France) is a French footballer who played as an attacking midfielder. He made 345 appearances and scored 51 goals in Ligue 1 for clubs Lille, Bastia, Brest, Nice, Toulon and Nantes during the period of 1978–92.

References

External links
 

1962 births
Living people
People from Armentières
Sportspeople from Nord (French department)
French footballers
Association football midfielders
Footballers from Hauts-de-France
Lille OSC players
SC Bastia players
Stade Brestois 29 players
OGC Nice players
FC Nantes players
Ligue 1 players
SC Toulon players